Maly Bukor is a rural locality (a village) in Chaykovsky, Perm Krai, Russia. The population was 180 as of 2010. There are 15 streets.

Geography 
Maly Bukor is located 17 km southeast of Chaykovsky. Bolshoy Bukor is the nearest rural locality.

References 

Rural localities in Chaykovsky urban okrug